Nersu (also Romanized as Nersū) is a village in Estarabad Rural District, Kamalan District, Aliabad County, Golestan Province, Iran. At the 2006 census, its population was 24, in 10 families.

References 

Populated places in Aliabad County